Caterham Graduates Racing Club is a British motor-racing club for privateer racing drivers in Caterham Seven type cars.

History

The Caterham Graduates Championship was started in 1998 by competitors from the 1997 Caterham Scholarship (subsequently Caterham Academy). For the first year it was called the Graduate 797 series (the first "7" for Caterham Seven, and "97" from the year that most drivers started competing). In its first two years, it was a multi-discipline series, with the rounds being made up of sprints (single car on track, against the clock), hillclimbs, and circuit races, similar to the Caterham Scholarship format. The emphasis moved more and more towards circuit races, and from 2000-on the series has been entirely circuit races.

In 2001, following the Caterham Academy's change to Rover-engined cars, the championship launched a second class named Super Graduates, based upon an uprated K-Series Academy car.

In 2003, the Super Graduates class was further upgraded and renamed the Mega Graduates.  A replacement Super Graduates class was created to accommodate standard ex-Academy cars with Rover K-series engines.

In 2007, the "Graduates" class was rebranded "Classic Graduates".

In 2010, Ford Sigma-engined cars were introduced as a sub-class of Super Graduates. From 2011 onwards, the Sigma cars have been a separate, 4th championship class.

In 2013, a 5th championship class was introduced for variants of the Ford Sigma-engined cars - SigMax. This allows suspension and engine upgrades in line with the Caterham Tracksport and Supersport series.

In 2019, the Super Graduates class was discontinued and merged into the Mega Graduate class. New classes were introduced for variable camshaft Sigma engines, 135 and 150 classes corresponding to 270R and 310R in the Caterham Motorsport series.

In 2020, the Mega Graduate class was merged into the SigMax class by allowing for the fitting of an LSD.

In 2021, Classic Graduates were discontinued leaving 135, 150 and SigMax classes.

The series is one of the largest in the UK, if not the largest, with well over 100 registered competitors. The competitors come from a variety of backgrounds - a number have "graduated" from the novice Caterham Scholarship and Academy series, whilst many others have made it their first foray into motorsport.

Racing

The Caterham Graduates race series takes place over a number of races meeting each year at UK and European motor racing circuits. The races are usually run over 20–30 minutes and the leading car across the line after the time has expired is the winner. Wherever possible, each class starts on its own grids, but on larger grids it is usually necessary to combine two or more classes. The events are typified by close wheel to wheel racing, often having several lead changes on the same lap.

Points are awarded thus: 40 for a win, 39 for 2nd place, 38 for 3rd place, right down to 2 points for finishing 39th or lower. And even a driver who fails to finish will still earn one point. At the end of the season, drivers drop their lowest three scores, to allow for missing a race or two, or a "DNF" (did not finish).

In addition to the standard Motorsport UK rules, the club operates a Driving Standards function which ensures that the close racing is fair and safe for all.

The club's racing is organised through the BARC.

Car Specifications

The cars in the series are genuinely road-going, although Mega and SigMax Graduates spec is moving away from this with the deletion of lights, and indeed a few are driven to and (hopefully) from races. Many are used by drivers mid-week for transport to work and for shopping, needing no more than the covering up of competition numbers to make them road-legal. No changes from the standard specification are allowed, putting the emphasis firmly on driving ability rather than car development and set-up. Along with low consumable costs, this keeps the costs of running a car very much under control, making it one of the most cost-effective ways to go racing. The large grid sizes are a testament to this low-cost formula.

Current classes are:

SigMax
Uprated 1600cc Ford Sigma-engined cars from the 2008 Caterham Academy onwards or 2009/10 Roadsport B. No lights or windscreen, widetrack suspension, controlled engine upgrades, limited slip differential (LSD) and lightened flywheel. Legacy "Mega Graduate" cars can also race in SigMax with the addition of an LSD to the previous Mega Graduate specification. Power is around 145 hp.

135
Uses the Ford Sigma engine with TiVCT variable valve timing, as used in the Caterham Academy from 2014 onwards. The specification mirrors the 270R specification in Caterham Motorsport apart from tyres, which are medium compound Yokohama AO48R. Upgrades from Academy spec include a rear anti-roll bar, wide-track front suspension, removal of headlights and windscreen and a mild engine retune. Power is 135 hp.

150
Upgrades from the 135 class, the 150 class mirrors the 310R specification in Caterham Motorsport apart from tyres, which are medium compound Yokohama AO48R. Upgrades from the 135 class include a limited slip differential and a further engine tune with airbox, different camshafts and remapped ignition. Power is 152 hp.

Affordability and Technical Support

Affordability is a key ingredient to Caterham Graduates racing. Strict regulations allow only limited modifications and work on the sealed engines is limited to nominated engine builders.

Other ways the club promotes affordability include limiting the amount of tyres the drivers can use through the season, providing race-day catering as part of the drivers' entry fees, and encouraging drivers either to stay on-site at the circuits or in budget hotels locally. Wherever possible, a low-priced "free practice" session is available before qualifying, so drivers can familiarise themselves with the circuit without having to book a full day of testing before the meeting.

Race Numbers

Race numbers 1-49 go to Mega Graduates, 51-69 to Sigma Graduates, 71-99 to Classic Graduates, 101-149 to Super Graduates and 151-199 to Sigmax Graduate cars.

The lower race numbers represent a driver's performance in the previous season, as the first ten numbers in each class are reserved for those finishing in the previous year's top ten. For instance, Ian Anderson's number 171 indicates that he came 1st in Sigma Graduates in 2011. Higher numbers go to those who are new to the championship or class.

Champions

Notable Past Champions
 2001 Super Graduate champion Nelson Rowe, who went on to win Caterham Roadsports A in 2002 and won the 2007 UK Historic Formula Ford Championship.
 2002 Super Graduate runner-up Jon Barnes, winner of the 2004 Caterham Eurocup series, the 2005 Caterham Masters championship, the 2006 Formula Palmer Audi championship and the 2008 British GT Championship.
 2002 Graduates Champion Rachel Green - the first woman to win a one-make Caterham championship, and twice winner of the Lord Wakefield trophy. The award is given for "outstanding achievement by a woman in motorsport worldwide."
 2006 Mega Graduate champion Guy Halley, who competed in the SEAT Cupra Championship, a support championship to the British Touring Car Championship.
 2007 Mega Graduate runner-up Ollie Jackson, who won the 2010 Pro-Am category of the Porsche Carrera Cup, drove the Lotus Evora GT4 in the 2011 British GT Championship, the Triple Eight Vauxhall Vectra in the 2011 British Touring Car Championship and the Century Motorsport Ginetta GT55 in the 2015 Ginetta GT4 Supercup.
 Multiple Classic, Super and Mega Graduate champion Jamie Ellwood, now a race-winner in the Caterham Superlight R300 championship. Jamie has won a total of 6 Caterham Championships, and the only person to have won all of the Graduates Club classes in which he competed. He is quoted by Caterham Cars as "the most successful Caterham racer ever".
 2009 Classic Graduate Champion Flick Haigh, who won the championship in an exciting final round decider at a very wet Spa Francorchamps. Flick is the second female champion in the club's history, following Rachel Green's triumph in 2002. After racing in the Caterham R300 championship, she is now driving an Optimum Motorsport Ginetta GT55 in the 2015 Ginetta GT4 Supercup.

Sponsors
About a dozen or so companies have their branding across each of the 100-plus racecars, and on the club's website www.cgrc.uk.

Relatively few of the drivers have individual sponsors, although this is permitted.

External links

References

One-make series
Graduates